There are at least 124 named mountains in Glacier County, Montana.
 Allen Mountain, el. 
 Almost-a-Dog Mountain, el. 
 Altyn Peak, el. 
 Amphitheater Mountain, el. 
 Angel Wing, el. 
 Antelope Butte, el. 
 Apikuni Mountain, el. 
 Appistoki Peak, el. 
 Bad Marriage Mountain, el. 
 Bald Hill, el. 
 Basin Mountain, el. 
 Bear Mountain, el. 
 Bearhead Mountain, el. 
 Bishops Cap, el. 
 Bison Mountain, el. 
 Bushnell Hill, el. 
 Calf Robe Mountain, el. 
 Campbell Mountain, el. 
 Cataract Mountain, el. 
 Cathedral Peak, el. 
 Chalk Butte, el. 
 Chapman Peak, el. 
 Chief Lodgepole Peak, el. 
 Chief Mountain, el. 
 Citadel Mountain, el. 
 Citadel Peaks, el. 
 Cracker, el. 
 Crowfeet Mountain, el. 
 Crusher Hill, el. 
 Curly Bear Mountain, el. 
 Dancing Lady Mountain, el. 
 Divide Mountain, el. 
 Duckhead Buttes, el. 
 Dusty Star Mountain, el. 
 Eagle Plume Mountain, el. 
 Eagle Point, el. 
 East Flattop Mountain, el. 
 Flinsch Peak, el. 
 Fusillade Mountain, el. 
 Gable Mountain, el. 
 Goat Haunt Mountain, el. 
 Goat Mountain, el. 
 Going-to-the-Sun Mountain, el. 
 Headlight Butte, el. 
 Heavy Runner Mountain, el. 
 Hoodoo Hill, el. 
 Horsethief Ridge, el. 
 Houseman Hill, el. 
 Iceberg Peak, el. 
 Ipasha Peak, el. 
 Kaina Mountain, el. 
 Kakitos Mountain, el. 
 Kootenai Peak, el. 
 Kupunkamint Mountain, el. 
 Landslide Butte, el. 
 Little Chief Mountain, el. 
 Little Crown Butte, el. 
 Looking Glass Hill, el. 
 Love Rock, el. 
 Mad Wolf Mountain, el. 
 Mahtotopa Mountain, el. 
 Matahpi Peak, el. 
 McClintock Peak, el. 
 Medicine Owl Peak, el. 
 Miche Wabun Peak, el. 
 Mount Baldy, el. 
 Mount Cleveland, el. 
 Mount Ellsworth, el. 
 Mount Gould, el. 
 Mount Grinnell, el. 
 Mount Helen, el. 
 Mount Henkel, el. 
 Mount Henry, el. 
 Mount James, el. 
 Mount Kipp, el. 
 Mount Logan, el. 
 Mount Merritt, el. 
 Mount Morgan, el. 
 Mount Pablo, el. 
 Mount Siyeh, el. 
 Mount Wilbur, el. 
 Naoi Point, el. 
 Natoas Peak, el. 
 Never Laughs Mountain, el. 
 Olson Mountain, el. 
 Otokomi Mountain, el. 
 Painted Tepee Peak, el. 
 Papoose (summit), el. 
 Piegan Mountain, el. 
 Pollock Mountain, el. 
 Porcupine Ridge, el. 
 Pyramid Peak, el. 
 Red Blanket Butte, el. 
 Red Buttes, el. 
 Red Eagle Mountain, el. 
 Red Mountain, el. 
 Redhorn Peak, el. 
 Reynolds Mountain, el. 
 Rimrock Butte, el. 
 Rising Wolf Mountain, el. 
 Rocky Buttes, el. 
 Sarcee Mountain, el. 
 Scenic Point, el. 
 Sentinel Mountain, el. 
 Seward Mountain, el. 
 Shaheeya Peak, el. 
 Sherburne Peak, el. 
 Singleshot Mountain, el. 
 Sinopah Mountain, el. 
 Split Mountain, el. 
 Spot Mountain, el. 
 Square Butte, el. 
 Stoney Indian Peaks, el. 
 Summit Mountain, el. 
 Swiftcurrent Mountain, el. 
 The Guardhouse, el. 
 The Head, el. 
 The Sentinel, el. 
 Thunderbird Mountain, el. 
 Twin Buttes, el. 
 Wahcheechee Mountain, el. 
 West Flattop Mountain, el. 
 White Calf Mountain, el. 
 Whitecrow Mountain, el. 
 Wynn Mountain, el. 
 Yellow Mountain, el.

See also
 List of mountains in Montana
 List of mountain ranges in Montana

References

Glacier